USS Jouett (DLG-29) was a  laid down 25 September 1962 by Puget Sound Naval Shipyard, Bremerton, Washington; launched 30 June 1964; sponsored by Mrs. S. J. Ervin, Jr., wife of the Senator from North Carolina; and commissioned 3 December 1966. She was named after RADM James Edward Jouett

Upon completion of fitting out in February 1967, Jouett was assigned to Cruiser-Destroyer Force, U.S. Pacific Fleet, and operated out of her homeport, San Diego.

Reclassified as a guided-missile cruiser, CG-29, on 30 June 1975, Jouett was decommissioned and stricken from the Navy Register on 28 January 1994 at San Diego. She was transferred 30 March the same year to the Maritime Administration, she was laid up at the Suisun Bay, CA reserve.

On 10 August 2007, she was towed to the Pacific to perform her last service; she was sunk as a target ship as part of Exercise Valiant Shield 2007.

The ship's bell is currently found outside the entrance to the Navy Entomology Center of Excellence Naval Air Station in Jacksonville, Florida. The bell is on loan from the Navy History and Heritage Command.

References

From K. Jack Bauer and Stephen S. Roberts, Register of Ships of the U.S. Navy, 1775-1990, p. 215. Naval Institute "Proceedings," May 1995, p. 217-219.

External links

http://www.ussjouett.com/ A website for former officers and crewmen of the USS Jouett (DLG/CG-29). 
Vice Admiral Samuel L. Gravely, Jr. was Commanding Officer of the USS Jouett and was appointed to Rear Admiral becoming the first African-American to achieve Flag Rank in the Navy

Belknap-class cruisers
Ships built in Bremerton, Washington
1964 ships
Cold War cruisers of the United States